Andrew Whittington (born 28 May 1971) is an Australian former professional rugby league footballer who played in the 1990s.

Playing career
In Round 14 of the 1992 NSWRL season, Whittington made his first grade debut for the Gold Coast Seagulls. In Round 19 of the 1993 season, he scored his first try in a 13–16 loss  to the South Sydney Rabbitohs. Over three seasons with the Gold Coast, he played 20 games.

In 1995, Whittington joined the newly-established North Queensland Cowboys. As part of his contract, he worked as the head groundskeeper at Stockland Stadium, the club's home ground. The job required him to stay overnight on occasion to turn the sprinkler system on. Whittington played in the club's inaugural match against the Sydney Bulldogs, starting at prop. He played 11 games for the Cowboys in 1995, departing at the end of the season.

In 1996, after not signing a Super League contract, Whittington returned to the Gold Coast Chargers, playing for their reserve grade side. 

In 1999, Whittington played for the Ipswich Jets in the Queensland Cup, before moving to the Tweed Heads Seagulls. In 2000, he represented the NSW Country representative side.

Statistics

NSWRL/ARL

References

1971 births
Living people
Australian rugby league players
Gold Coast Chargers players
North Queensland Cowboys players
Ipswich Jets players
Tweed Heads Seagulls players
Rugby league props
Place of birth missing (living people)